The Department of Education Organization Act is a United States federal law enacted in 1979.

Purpose
Congress established the United States Department of Education (ED) with the Department of Education Organization Act. Under the law, ED's mission is to:

Strengthen the federal commitment to assuring access to equal educational opportunity for every individual;
Supplement and complement the efforts of states, the local school systems and other instrumentalities of the states, the private sector, public and private nonprofit educational research institutions, community-based organizations, parents, and students to improve the quality of education;
Encourage the increased involvement of the public, parents, and students in federal education programs;
Promote improvements in the quality and usefulness of education through federally supported research, evaluation, and sharing of information;
Increase the accountability of federal education programs to the president, the Congress, and the public.

Voting
In the Senate, 69 voted in favor and 22 voted against separating education from the Department of Health, Education, and Welfare. In the House of Representatives, 215 voted in favor and 201 voted against. President Carter signed the bill on October 17, 1979.

Following the establishment of the Department of Education, the Department of Health, Education, and Welfare was renamed the Department of Health and Human Services.

Notes

External links
 United States Department of Education official website
 About ED - Overview of the U.S. Department of Education
 How the Department of Education Is Organized
 Copy of the original Department of Education Act (P.L. 96-88; 93 Stat. 668), History of Federal Education Policy website
 20 USC Sec. 3402, full text of the act as currently in force
 ERIC Digests - Offers full-text access to public domain ERIC Digests produced by the U.S. Department of Education

Organization Act
United States federal education legislation
1979 in law
United States federal government administration legislation
96th United States Congress
1980 in education